Tony Baker may refer to:

 Tony Baker (running back, born 1945) (1945–1998), American football running back for the New Orleans Saints, Philadelphia Eagles, Los Angeles Rams and San Diego Chargers
 Tony Baker (running back, born 1964), American football running back for the Atlanta Falcons, Cleveland Browns, Phoenix Cardinals and Frankfurt Galaxy